The Garland Carnegie Library, at 86 W. Factory St. in Garland, Utah, is a Carnegie library which was built in 1914.  It was listed on the National Register of Historic Places in 1914.

Like many Carnegie libraries, it is a one-story structure built on a raised basement.  It was built by the Newton Company in Classical Revival style.

References

Carnegie libraries in Utah
National Register of Historic Places in Box Elder County, Utah
Neoclassical architecture in Utah
Library buildings completed in 1914